The genus Kerodon (vernacular name Mocos; Rock Cavies) contains two species of South American rock cavies, related to capybaras and guinea pigs.
They are found in semiarid regions of northeast Brazil known as the Caatinga. This area has a rocky terrain with large granite boulders that contain rifts and hollows where Kerodon spp. primarily live.

Characteristics
They are hystricomorph rodents, medium-sized, with rabbit-like bodies, a squirrel-like face, and heavily padded feet. Their nails are blunt on all digits except a small grooming claw on the outermost digit of the foot. Fully grown adults weigh around 1000 g or 31-35 oz, and range in length from 200 to 400 mm or 7.5 to 16 in. They forage for mostly leaves, grasses, seeds, and tree bark. They breed year round, usually having one to three litters per year and one to three young per pregnancy. Gestation last around 76 days and the young are weaned from the mother within 33 days. They reach sexual maturity at 133 days.

Behavior
Like their relatives, the capybaras and the maras, members of the genus Kerodon are highly social.   Kerodon spp., like the capybaras, are polygynous, with males forming harems. They are very vocal creatures and make many different whistles, chirps, and squeaks. Males claim one or several rock piles as their own and defend their territory. Each male has a few female mates and a hierarchy exists within each group. They are most often active late in the day.

Classification
Traditionally, the genus Kerodon has been considered a member of the subfamily Caviinae along with the guinea pigs and other cavies.  Molecular results have consistently suggested Kerodon is most closely related to the capybara, and the two evolved from within the Caviidae.  This led Woods and Kilpatrick (2005) to unite the two into the subfamily Hydrochoerinae within the Caviidae.  Using a molecular clock approach, Opazo suggested Kerodon diverged from Hydrochoerus (the capybara) in the late Middle Miocene.

Species
Kerodon acrobata Moojen, Locks & Langguth, 1997 – climbing cavy
Kerodon rupestris Wied-Neuwied, 1820 – rock cavy

References

Further reading 
 Nowak, Ronald M. 1999. Walker's Mammals of the World, 6th edition. Johns Hopkins University Press, 1936 pp. 

Cavies
Rodent genera
Taxa named by Frédéric Cuvier